Hardress Nathaniel Swaim (November 30, 1890 – July 30, 1957) was a justice of the Indiana Supreme Court and later a United States circuit judge of the United States Court of Appeals for the Seventh Circuit.

Education and career

Born in Zionsville, Indiana, Swaim received an Artium Baccalaureus degree from DePauw University in 1913 and a Juris Doctor from the University of Chicago Law School in 1916. He was in private practice in Indianapolis, Indiana from 1916 to 1939, interrupted by service in the United States Army as a First Lieutenant from 1917 to 1918. He was Comptroller of the City of Indianapolis from 1936 to 1947. He was a justice of the Indiana Supreme Court from January 1, 1939 to January 1, 1945, thereafter returning to private practice in Indianapolis from 1945 to 1949.

Federal judicial service

Swaim received a recess appointment from President Harry S. Truman on October 21, 1949, to the United States Court of Appeals for the Seventh Circuit, to a new seat authorized by 63 Stat. 493. He was nominated to the same position by President Truman on January 5, 1950. He was confirmed by the United States Senate on February 8, 1950, and received his commission on February 10, 1950. His service terminated on July 30, 1957, due to his death.

References

Sources
 

1890 births
1957 deaths
Justices of the Indiana Supreme Court
People from Zionsville, Indiana
Judges of the United States Court of Appeals for the Seventh Circuit
United States court of appeals judges appointed by Harry S. Truman
20th-century American judges
DePauw University alumni
University of Chicago Law School alumni
United States Army officers